Rod Furniss is an American businessman and politician serving as a member of the Idaho House of Representatives for District 35, seat B.

Early life and education 
Furniss was born in Rigby, Idaho and grew up in Menan. He attended Rigby High School.

Furniss attended Ricks College. In 1983, Furniss earned an associate degree in accounting and business management from Brigham Young University–Idaho. In 1985, Furniss earned as bachelor's degree in finance and financial management services from Idaho State University.

Career 
Furniss is a former missionary for Church of Christ (Latter Day Saints) in Argentina.

In 1986, Furniss became an Independent Agent with Rod Furniss Chartered Life Underwriter. Furniss is in the insurance and investment business. Furniss is a life insurance underwriter and financial consultant.

On November 6, 2018, Furniss won the election and became a member of Idaho House of Representatives for District 35, seat B. Furniss defeated Jerry L. Browne with 83.7% of the votes.

Personal life 
Furniss' wife is Jan Furniss. They have five children.

References

External links 
 rodfurniss.com
 Rod Furniss at ballotpedia.org

Living people
Republican Party members of the Idaho House of Representatives
American Mormon missionaries in Argentina
Brigham Young University–Idaho alumni
Idaho State University alumni
Latter Day Saints from Idaho
People from Jefferson County, Idaho
Year of birth missing (living people)
People from Rigby, Idaho
21st-century American politicians